Marion Historic District is a national historic district located at Marion, Smyth County, Virginia. The district includes 361 contributing buildings, 2 contributing sites, and 1 contributing object in the central business district and surrounding residential areas of Marion. It includes a variety of residential, commercial, institutional, industrial, and governmental buildings primarily dating from the mid-19th to mid-20th centuries.  Notable buildings include the Sheffey Loom House (c. 1855), Odd Fellows Lodge (c. 1860), Look & Lincoln Wagon Factory warehouse (c. 1880), the Beaux-Arts style Marion County Courthouse (1905), Mt. Pleasant Methodist Church, Courtview Building (1890s), Marion High School (1907-1908), Marion Junior College (1912), the Overall Factory (c. 1920), Weiler Building (c. 1930), Bank of Marion (1922), Royal Oak Presbyterian Church (1923), Marion Municipal Building (1935), Marion Post Office (1936), and a Lustron house (1948).  Also located in the district are the separately listed Hotel Lincoln, Lincoln Theatre, Marion Male Academy, and Norfolk & Western Railway Depot.

It was listed on the National Register of Historic Places in 2000, with a boundary increase in 2011.

References

Historic districts in Smyth County, Virginia
Beaux-Arts architecture in Virginia
Queen Anne architecture in Virginia
National Register of Historic Places in Smyth County, Virginia
Historic districts on the National Register of Historic Places in Virginia